Michel Le Neuf de la Vallière de Beaubassin (the elder) (1640 – 1705) was a military figure who became a governor of Acadia under French control. He was the son of Jacques Leneuf de La Poterie and Marguerite Legardeur, who both originally came from Normandy and together with their extended families settled in Canada.

The Le Neuf family came from Caen, France, and settled in Trois-Rivières, Canada, in 1636. They were the first nobles to settle in New France and held positions of power and prestige through several generations.

References

External links 

Leneuf, Michel (the elder)
1640 births
1705 deaths
Military personnel from Caen